Regina Tucker (born 8 December 1994), known professionally as MYRA, is a Norwegian rapper and songwriter, originally from Sandviken, Bergen, Norway. Her musical style is a mixture of alternative rap and R&B, and she has been rapping in Bergen dialect since 2016.

References

Eksterne links 
 Myra on Spotify
 Myra on Instagram

1994 births
Living people
Musicians from Bergen
Norwegian-language singers
Sierra Leonean emigrants to Norway
Norwegian people of Sierra Leonean descent
21st-century Norwegian singers
People educated at Langhaugen Upper Secondary School